Fidel Rocha dos Santos (born 6 July 1993 in Brazil), known as just Fidel, is a Brazilian footballer.

References

External links
Profile at Soccerway

Brazilian footballers
Association football forwards
Living people
1993 births
Ansan Greeners FC players
Murici Futebol Clube players
Rio Branco Sport Club players